Soor may refer to:

Sur, Iran, a village
Soor State, a princely state of India merged with Idar State in 1821
Battle of Soor (1745), in Bohemia
Régina Airport (ICAO:SOOR), in French Guiana
Tyre, Lebanon
Pritpal Soor, London-based music producer and writer

See also
Sur (disambiguation)